This is a list of flag bearers who have represented Bahrain at the Olympics.

Flag bearers carry the national flag of their country at the opening ceremony of the Olympic Games.

See also
Bahrain at the Olympics

References

Bahrain at the Olympics
Bahrain
Olympic